Chiriquí Grande   is a corregimiento in Chiriquí Grande District, Bocas del Toro Province, Panama. It is the seat of Chiriquí Grande District. Its population as of 1990 was 7,637; its population as of 2000 was 2,069. The town is located on the southern shore of Chiriquí Lagoon and its port serves as the northern terminus of the Trans-Panama pipeline.

References

Corregimientos of Bocas del Toro Province
Panamanian coasts of the Caribbean Sea
Populated coastal places in Panama
Ports and harbours of Panama